The spelling reforms of modern Bulgarian orthography were used to make simpler the writing of standard Bulgarian language.

History
Until the 19th century, Bulgarian was predominantly a spoken language, with no standardized written form of the vernacular dialects. Formal written communication was usually in the Church Slavonic language. For a long time the Cyrillic script was primarily associated with religious texts, and as such it was more resistant to changes. The early Cyrillic alphabet from the 9th century developed in the First Bulgarian Empire, contained 44 letters for 44 sounds. However, by the 19th century the Bulgarian sound system had changed and contained fewer sounds. Several Cyrillic alphabets with 28 to 44 letters were used in the early and middle 19th century. That necessitated an alphabet reform, which to reduce the number of the letters. 

The printed Russian alphabet began to assume its modern shape when Peter I introduced his civil script type reform in 1708. The reform aimed to simplify the composition of the Russian alphabet and replace the existing Church Slavonic fonts with patterns similar to European ones. In the following decades, the new Russian Cyrillic continued to develop, and in the 19th century it became the basis for the reforms followed by Bulgarian  people. A key moment in the history of the Bulgarian alphabet was in the 1830s, when the transition from the traditional Church Slavonic Cyrillic alphabet to the Russian civil alphabet of Tsar Peter I,  took place. As then Bulgaria was part of the Ottoman Empire in 1869 Bulgarian émigrés founded the so called Bulgarian Literary Society in Brăila, Kingdom of Romania, with Marin Drinov as its chairman. In a number of articles he examined problems of orthography and grammar of the Bulgarian language. 

In 1878 a distinct Bulgarian Principality was founded. Meanwhile there were various attempts to standardize the spelling: by Drinov himself in 1862 and by Nayden Gerov in 1895. Finally an alphabet with 32 letters, proposed by Drinov gained prominence in 1899. This reform dropped some yuses (Ѭ /jɤ/, Ѧ /e/, and Ѩ /je/). A certain bridge between the eastern and western dialects of Bulgaria was also provided by that archaic orthography, which at the same time obscured the differences between Bulgarian and Church Slavonic. The use of such an orthography, however, made the teaching of Bulgarian difficult. It remained in force until the end of the Second World War, with a short interruption from 1921-1923. Then the government of the Bulgarian Agrarian National Union cabinet, introduced a new, simplified Bulgarian orthography. However it was undone after the coup d'état of 9 June 1923. 

The last major orthographic reform was of 1945. Then the letters Ѣ, ѣ (called ят "yat") and Ѫ, ѫ (called Голям юс "big yus"), were also removed from the alphabet, reducing the number of letters to 30. This orthographic reform in practice introduced the phonetic principle and brought written language closer to contemporary pronunciation. The preparing of the reform began many years before its completion. The reform was made in six months, but its implementation continued over 20 years.

See also
 Bulgarian alphabet

Notes

Cyrillic-script orthographies
Orthography